RFA Retainer (A329) was an armament support ship of the Royal Fleet Auxiliary.

Built by Scotts of Greenock as Chungking, a cargo/passenger liner for the China Navigation Co. Both Chungking and her sister vessel Changchow (later  lost their initial purpose due to the Communist revolution. Chartered for a year and a half to the French Messageries Maritimes, they were purchased by the British Admiralty in 1952. 

In 1959, Retainer was used with the missile trials ship  for trials of replenishment at sea with the new Seaslug missile.

References 

Ships of the Royal Fleet Auxiliary
Stores ships of the Royal Fleet Auxiliary
1950 ships